Fotu Suluka Lokotui (born 19 March 1992) is a Tongan rugby union player who generally plays as a Flanker. He represents Tonga internationally. He was included in the Tongan squad for the 2019 Rugby World Cup which is held in Japan for the first time and also marks his first World Cup appearance.

Rugby Union career

Professional career

He played for Asia Pacific Dragons in Singapore; Samoa Kagifa in Samoa; and Counties Manukau in New Zealand before moving to the Northern Hemisphere.

On 29 November 2019, Lokotui joined Doncaster Knights in the English RFU Championship until the end of the 2019–20 season.

On 1 October 2020 he signed for Scottish club Glasgow Warriors in the Pro14 competition after a successful trial. He made his competitive debut as a substitute coming on against Connacht at the Galway Sportsgrounds on 3 October 2020. He became Glasgow Warrior No. 314.

On 31 May 2021, Lokotui would sign for French side Agen in the Pro D2 competition ahead of the 2021–22 season.

International career

He made his international debut for Tonga against Japan on 18 November 2017.

References 

1992 births
Living people
Tongan rugby union players
Tonga international rugby union players
Glasgow Warriors players
Counties Manukau rugby union players
Doncaster Knights players
SU Agen Lot-et-Garonne players
Rugby union flankers